Sylvia Sherry (née Blunt) (born 21 April 1932) is an English author.

She is best known for her book A Pair of Jesus Boots, a popular novel for children and young adults set in the post-war slums of Liverpool. The book was adapted as Rocky O'Rourke for a BBC drama serial in 1976. Four other Rocky O'Rourke books followed. Her earlier works use settings and characters drawn from Malaysia and Singapore.

Her former husband is the biographer Norman Sherry.

Other works
A Pair of Desert Wellies
A Snake in the Old Hut
The Loss of the "Night Wind"
The Haven-Screamers"
Elephants Have Right of Way
Dark River, Dark Mountain
Street of the Small Night Market, set in Singapore's Chinatown
Frog in a Coconut Shell

References 

1932 births
Living people
English children's writers